Ždírec is a municipality and village in Jihlava District in the Vysočina Region of the Czech Republic. It has about 400 inhabitants.

Geography
It is located in the Upper Sázava Hills within the Bohemian-Moravian Highlands. The Ždírecký Stream flows through the municipality. There are several small fish ponds on the stream.

History

The first written mention of Ždírec is from 1233. From the 13th century until 1945 Ždírec was ethnically a German village. It belonged to the German-speaking enclave called Jihlava Language Island. After the World War II, the Germans were expelled and the municipality was resettled by Czechs.

Sights
The landmark of Ždírec is the parish Church of Saint Wenceslaus. It was built in the pseudo-Gothic style in 1893–1898, after the old church was destroyed by a fire in 1890. It became a cultural monument of the Czech Republic in 1958.

Other sights include Baroque sculptural group of Saint John of Nepomuk from 1743, Baroque statue of Anthony of Padua from 1753, or the building of retirement home from 1926 with Chapel of the Virgin Mary.

References

External links

Villages in Jihlava District